is a Japanese astronomer. He is credited with the discovery of 13 asteroids by the Minor Planet Center.

References 
 

1949 births
Discoverers of asteroids

20th-century Japanese astronomers
Living people